José Saúl Ramírez Briceño (born 29 September 1998) is a Mexican professional footballer who plays as a forward for Th'o Mayas FC.

References

External links
 

1998 births
Living people
Mexican footballers
Association football forwards
Venados F.C. players
Ascenso MX players
Liga de Expansión MX players
Liga Premier de México players
Tercera División de México players
Footballers from Yucatán
Sportspeople from Mérida, Yucatán